Coccoid means shaped like or resembling a coccus, that is, spherical.The noun coccoid or coccoids may refer to:

 a level of organization, characterized by unicellular, non-flagellated, non-amoeboid organisms, with a definite shape, in general but not always ovoid. It is found in many groups, e.g.:
 some bacteria, also called cocci (pl. of coccus)
 some green algae, like the desmids and the former Chlorococcales (now in several orders within the division Chlorophyta)
 some dinoflagellates, notably Symbiodinium
 some chrysophytes
 some xanthophytes
 the diatoms
 the superfamily Coccoidea of scale insects
 the Coccidae family within the Coccoidea

See also
 Coccolite, a form of the mineral diopside
 Coccolithophore, a class of phytoplankton (alga)
 Coccolith, a platelet formed by coccolithophore, found in chalk